Jason Laslett (born 1 July 1969) is a former international field hockey player.

Laslett was born in Canterbury, Kent. He was educated at Millfield School. He played hockey for England and Great Britain over 170 times and captained Great Britain at the Atlanta Olympics in 1996.

He played most of his club career for Teddington Hockey Club, with whom he won the Men's England Hockey League in 1995 and the Hockey Association Cup twice in 1994 and 1996.

Laslett won the Hockey Writers UK Player of the Year Award in 1991 and the National League Player of the Year Award for the 1990-91 season.

References
 
 EHL Statistics

External links
 

Living people
English male field hockey players
Sportspeople from Canterbury
People educated at Millfield
1969 births
Olympic field hockey players of Great Britain
British male field hockey players
Field hockey players at the 1992 Summer Olympics
Field hockey players at the 1996 Summer Olympics
Teddington Hockey Club players
Men's England Hockey League players